SAF 2507, also known as Sandvik SAF 2507, is a Sandvik-owned trademark for a 25Cr duplex (ferritic-austenitic) stainless steel. The nominal chemical composition of SAF 2507 is 25% chromium, 7% nickel, 4% molybdenum and other alloying elements such as nitrogen and manganese. The UNS designation for SAF 2507 is S32750 and the EN steel no. is 1.4410.  SAF derives from Sandvik Austenite Ferrite.

Typical properties of SAF 2507 duplex stainless steel are:
 excellent resistance to stress corrosion cracking in chloride-bearing environments
 excellent resistance to pitting corrosion and crevice corrosion
 high resistance to general corrosion
 very high mechanical strength
 physical properties that offer design advantages
 high resistance to erosion corrosion and corrosion fatigue
 good weldability

See also
 Duplex Stainless Steel

References

External links
 Technical data for SAF 2507 (seamless tube & pipe)
Unity Metal Professional Stainless Steel Handrail

Stainless steel